Fatih (formerly: Ahırköy) is a quarter of the town İpsala, İpsala District, Edirne Province, Turkey. Its population is 302 (2022). Its postal code is 22490.

References

Populated places in İpsala District